The Honourable George Percy (4 September 1580 – 1632) was an English explorer, author, and early Colonial Governor of Virginia.

Early life
George Percy was born in England, the youngest son of Henry Percy, 8th Earl of Northumberland and Lady Catherine Neville.  He was sickly for much of his life, possibly suffering from epilepsy or severe asthma.  He graduated from Oxford University in 1597.  While at university, he gained admission to Gloucester Hall and the Middle Temple.

Percy's vocation was the military.  His first service came in the Dutch struggle for independence from Spain in the early 1600s.  He also served in Ireland.

Life in Virginia
Percy was part of the first group of 105 English colonists to settle the Jamestown Colony.  He departed England in December 1606 and kept a journal of his voyage.  He arrived in Virginia in April 1607 and recorded the struggles of the colonists to cope with the American environment, disease, and the Powhatan Native Americans.  "Thus we lived for the space of five months in this miserable distress," he wrote in his journal, "not having five able men to man our bulwarks upon any occasion."

Although Percy had a higher social rank than all of the other first colonists, he was initially denied a seat on the Virginia Council.  Nevertheless, he took the lead in the early life of the colony, taking part in the expedition to the James River falls in May and June 1607.  In autumn 1607, he sided with the President of the colony, Edward Maria Wingfield, who was subsequently deposed by John Ratcliffe, Gabriel Archer, and Captain John Smith.  From late 1607 until autumn 1609, Percy had little power in Jamestown but served as Smith's subordinate.

When Smith left the colony in September 1609, Percy assumed the presidency of the colony.  However, his persistent illness kept him from executing his office, leaving the duties of the presidency to Ratcliffe, Archer, and John Martin.  It was during Percy's tenure that the colony suffered through the "Starving Time" in the winter of 1609–10.  "Now all of us at James Town beginning to feel that sharp prick of hunger, which no man truly describe but he which hath tasted the bitterness thereof," he recounted later.  Percy accomplished little while President, other than to order to construction of Fort Algernon at Old Point Comfort.  When Sir Thomas Gates arrived in May 1610, Percy happily surrendered control of the colony to him.

In June 1610, Thomas West, 3rd Baron De La Warr arrived in Jamestown and with a commission to serve as the colony's governor.  De la Warr appointed Percy to the council and named him captain of the Jamestown fort.  In August 1610, De la Warre sent Percy and seventy men to attack the Paspahegh and Chickahominy tribes.  The force ravaged the tribal settlements, burning their buildings, decimating their crops, and indiscriminately killing men, women, and children.  Percy also led the successful defense of the Jamestown fort against a Native American attack and earned the praise of De La Warr.  When the Governor returned to England in March 1611, he appointed Percy to lead the colony in his absence.  "But the winds not favoring them, they were enforced to shape their course directly for England—my lord having left and appointed me deputy governor in his absence, to execute martial law or any other power and authority as absolute as himself."  Percy's term as Governor lasted until April 22, 1612, when he departed for England.

After Virginia
After his service as Virginia colony governor, Percy returned to England but remained interested in colonization schemes.  In 1615, he proposed an expedition to Guiana but found no supporters.  In 1620, he sold his four shares in the Virginia Company and returned to military service. Percy returned to the Netherlands in 1621 when war between Spain and the Dutch resumed. He was the commander of a company in the Low Countries in 1627. He died in 1632.

Marriage
George Percy married Anne Floyd.

The couple had one daughter, Anne Percy, who married Governor John West.

Ancestry

References

Sources
Jeffrey D. Groves, "George Percy," in American National Biography, ed. John A. Garraty and Mark C. Carnes (New York: Oxford University Press, 1999), 17:318–19.
John W. Shirley, "George Percy at Jamestown, 1607–1612," Virginia Magazine of History and Biography 57 (1949): 227–43.
Philip L. Barbour, "The Honorable George Percy, Premier Chronicler of the First Virginia Voyage," Early American Literature 6 (1971): 7–17.

Colonial governors of Virginia
George
1580 births
1632 deaths
Alumni of Gloucester Hall, Oxford
Members of the Middle Temple
People from Jamestown, Virginia
Younger sons of earls